Al-Fajr (الفجر) may refer to:

Al-Fajr (sura), the 89th sura of the Qur'an
Fajr, the first of the five salat prayers

Media
Al Fajr, a UAE newspaper based in Abu Dhabi
El Fagr (Egyptian Arabic pronunciation of Al-Fajr), an Egyptian newspaper
Al-Fajr English Weekly, a Palestinian English-language weekly formerly published in Jerusalem
Al-Fajr (Palestinian newspaper), an Arabic daily newspaper published in Jerusalem from 1971 to 1993
Al-Fajr (Tunisian newspaper), the now-defunct newspaper of the formerly banned Tunisian Islamist opposition movement Al-Nahda, now Ennahda
Al-Fajr TV (est. 2004), an Islamic TV channel
Al-Fajr (literary magazine), an Egyptian literary magazine associated with al-Madrasa al-Haditha
Al-Fajr (1934-1935 magazine), an Egyptian magazine published by Hassan Dhu-l-Fiqar

Other uses
Operation Phantom Fury, The Second Battle of Falluja, code-named Operation Al-Fajr and Operation Phantom Fury 
Al-Fajr Movement, a Syrian Islamic militant group, reported to have cooperated with Al-Nusra Front in 2012